Getting wet may refer to:
 Coming to be affected by moisture
 Coming to be affected by wetting
 The onset of vaginal lubrication

See also 
 Get Wet (disambiguation)
 Wet (disambiguation)